Jastrzębowski, feminine: Jastrzębowska, plural: Jastrzębowscy is a Polish-language surname. It may be phonetically spelled as Jastrzembowski/Jastrzembowska. It is a toponymic surname derived from one of the several Polish locations named Jastrzębowo and literally meaning "one from Jastrzębowo". Ultimately derived from jastrząb, or "hawk". It is Russified as Yastrzhembovsky / Yastrzhembovskaya.

Notable people with this surname include:
Janusz Jastrzębowski, drummer of Polish band Artrosis
Jerzy Jastrzębowski (born 1951), Polish footballer and manager
Wojciech Jastrzębowski (1799–1882), Polish scientist, naturalist and inventor, professor of botanic, physics, zoology and horticulture

See also
Jastrzębski

Polish-language surnames
Polish toponymic surnames